Marc David Allera (born 5 April 1972) is the CEO of BT's Consumer brands: EE, BT and Plusnet.

Early life
He was born in Howden in 1972, then in the East Riding of Yorkshire (pre-1974). He is of Italian descent. He attended France Hill School (now called Kings International College) in Camberley.

He graduated in International Business Studies from Sheffield Hallam University (Sheffield Business School) in 1995, where he started in 1991.

Career

Sega
From 1997 until 2001 he was UK General Manager of video game company Sega Corporation.

Three
He joined Three UK in March 2001. The company was launched in March 2003.

EE
He joined EE in December 2011 from Three UK.

He became Chief Executive Officer (CEO) of EE on 29 January 2016. On 1 September 2017, EE joined BT Consumer and Marc was promoted to CEO of BT's Consumer Group. EE is headquartered in Hertfordshire whereas BT is headquartered in London. In 2018 and 2019, Marc won the Power 50 Person of the Year, a mobile industry award.

See also
 David Dyson, Chief Executive since July 2011 of Three UK
 Nick Jeffery, Chief Executive since September 2016 of Vodafone UK

References

External links
 EE

1972 births
Alumni of Sheffield Hallam University
British people of Italian descent
British Telecom people
British telecommunications industry businesspeople
People from Camberley
People from Howden
Living people